Three auxiliary routes of Arkansas Highway 18 exist in Northeast Arkansas, with one former alignment.

Newport spur

Arkansas Highway 18 Spur is a spur route that runs to Newport Municipal Airport.

Major intersections

Jonesboro spur

Arkansas Highway 18 Spur is a spur route in Jonesboro known as Commerce Drive. Commerce Drive is two-lane undivided.

Major intersections

Manila business route

Highway 18 Business (AR 18B, Ark. 18B, Hwy. 18B, and Lake Street) is a business route in the small town of Manila. It connects AR 18 to AR 77 (Beauchamp Street).

History
The Arkansas State Highway Commission created AR 18B on March 7, 1962 from a former alignment of AR 77 through downtown Manila. It was extended along another former alignment of AR 77 on June 23, 1965, now running along Baltimore Avenue and Lake Street.

Major intersections

Mississippi County spur route

Arkansas Highway 18 Spur is a former spur route between Leachville and Manilla in Mississippi County, Arkansas.

Major intersections

References

Works cited
 

018
Transportation in Craighead County, Arkansas
Transportation in Jackson County, Arkansas
Transportation in Mississippi County, Arkansas